Classeya trichelites is a moth in the family Crambidae. It was described by Edward Meyrick in 1936. It is found in the Democratic Republic of the Congo and South Africa.

References

Crambinae
Moths described in 1936